Aroha Edward Awarau (born Hāwera, New Zealand) is a journalist and playwright. He won the 2008 New Zealand Magazine Journalist of the Year (Mass Market) at the annual Magazine Publisher's Association Award. He was a finalist again for the same award in 2011, 2012, 2014 and 2016. In 2013 he was awarded the NZ Celebrity and Entertainment magazine journalist of the year at the Magazine Publisher's Award.
  
He is a former news editor for the Woman's Day magazine, and a senior writer at New Zealand Woman's Weekly. He is currently a story producer for the Māori Television current affairs show Native Affairs.

Awarau is also a successful playwright, with his first play Luncheon, starring accomplished NZ actress Jennifer Ward-Lealand and directed by Katie Wolfe, winning Best Play at the 2014 New Zealand Script Writing Awards. His second play "Officer 27" was a finalist at the NZ Adams Playwriting awards and the New Zealand Script Writing Awards in 2016.  His short film Home premiered at the imagineNATIVE Film + Media Arts Festival in Toronto.

Awarau has a degree in film and television from the University of Waikato, and a journalism degree from the Auckland University of Technology. After leaving Waikato University in 1998, Awarau worked in the New Zealand film industry for two years, working on films such as  What Becomes of the Broken Hearted? and The Price of Milk.

Awarau also had a short stint as a stand up comedian, becoming a finalist in the Raw Quest, a national competition to find the best new comedian and appeared as a contestant in the reality show So You Think You’re Funny?, a competition to find New Zealand's funniest new comedian.

While still at high school Awarau was the first writer to become a three-time winner of the Ronald Hugh Morrieson Literary Award.  The annual award was created by the South Taranaki District Council to commemorate Hāwera's most famous author, Ronald Hugh Morrieson.

In October 2019 he was presented with a Scroll of Honour from the Variety Artists Club of New Zealand for his contribution to New Zealand entertainment.

References

External links
 

Auckland University of Technology alumni
Living people
New Zealand journalists
University of Waikato alumni
Year of birth missing (living people)
People from Hāwera
21st-century New Zealand dramatists and playwrights
New Zealand male dramatists and playwrights
People educated at Hawera High School